Mehdi Chahkoutahzadeh (born May 26, 1989) is an Iranian footballer who plays for Fajr Sepasi in the Azadegan League.

Club career
Heidari had played his entire career with Iranjavan, until he moved to Fajr Sepasi in the summer of 2014.

References

1989 births
Living people
Malavan players
Fajr Sepasi players
Saba players
Iranian footballers
Association football midfielders
Shahin Bushehr F.C. players
People from Bushehr
21st-century Iranian people